The SNCF class BB 15000 is a class of 25 kV 50 Hz electric locomotives built by Alstom and MTE between 1971 and 1978. Initially 65 locomotives strong, the class was widely deployed on the whole French 25 kV network before being replaced by TGV trains when the LGV Est went into service in 2007.

History
In the mid-1960s, SNCF sought a new type of dual-current electric locomotives. As thyristor technology advanced rapidly, SNCF decided to adopt the new technology for a new series of locomotives, later known as the Nez Cassés (Broken Noses, due to their cab styling by Paul Arzens) or BB 4400 kW. Given that the need for pure AC-locomotives was greatest, SNCF placed an initial order of five locomotives in 1968. In 1969 a second order of 10 locomotives followed, in 1970 a third order was made for another 10 locomotives. The remaining 40 locomotives were ordered in 1973.

The first five locomotives were delivered in 1971 in the overall-green "Maurienne" livery. The rest followed between 1973 and 1978, painted in the striking TEE-Arzens livery.

Career

1970s-2007

After being tested on the Paris–Épernay main line in 1971, they entered revenue service from 1972. They ran mostly on the northeastern network where they hauled nearly all the principle passenger trains, including the national TEE trains Kléber and Stanislas. Some services extended to the northwest, with workings to Lille, Calais and the Belgian border at Quévy.

Services remained stable throughout the 1970s and 1980s, but the opening of the Ligne-a-Grande-Vitesse Nord in 1993 started a cascade of assignments in which the BB 15000's lost services to either dual-voltage BB 26000 locomotives or to TGV trains. Yet BB 15000 locomotives remained strong in the northeast and hauled Corail Téoz services between Paris and Strasbourg from 2003 until mid-2005, when half of the loco-hauled services were converted to TGV trainsets, albeit still running on the classic line. In mid-2006 the remainder were also converted into TGV services, leaving only some TER trains for the Lorraine and Alsace regions, and the EuroCity trains between Basel and Brussels (loco change at Luxemburg) or Paris and Frankfurt (loco change at Strasbourg).

The partial opening of the LGV Est in June 2007 meant the end of classic locomotive-hauled Intercity trains between Paris and the northeastern regions, with BB 15000 locomotives losing a great deal of importance there.

2007-present
Although the end of locomotive-hauled Intercity trains in the northeast marked a downgrading of duties, it did not result in the withdrawal of the class.
The remaining 60 locomotives are divided over the following three sectors:
 Twelve locomotives were allocated to SNCF-VFE and worked Basel-Luxembourg EuroCity services, as well as DB AutoZug's night train from Paris-Nord to the Belgian border. These locomotives are fitted with the Memor II+ safety system which enables them to operate in Luxembourg. These locomotives are numbered in the 115000 series. This Basel-Luxembourg EuroCity service ended during the summer of 2016 and the locomotives assigned to it were reassigned at that time.
 Twenty-eight locomotives are allocated to SNCF-CIC (Corail Intercité) and are working medium to long distance regional services between Paris and Amiens/Maubeuge on the one end, and Paris-Caen/Deauville/Le Havre on the other end. Twelve locomotives of this sub-series, called BB215000R (from "Réversible"), are fitted with MUX which enables them to work in push-pull with the Corail B6Dux driving trailers and will be replacing BB216000 locomotives there. This sub-series is numbered in the 215000 series.
 Twenty locomotives are allocated to SNCF-TER Champagne-Ardennes, Haute-Normandie and Picardie, working fast TER services and replacing the remaining BB516000 locomotives. Fifteen locomotives of this sub-series, called BB515000R, are fitted with MUX in able to operate in push-pull mode with V2N driving trailers on Paris-Rouen (Haute-Normandie) and Paris-Amiens (Picardie) and will be replacing BB516100 locomotives there. This sub-series is numbered in the 515000 series.

Technology
The locomotive's body shell is shared with the other members of the "Nez Cassé" (broken nose) family (BB7200, BB22200) and is of the monocoque type.

The cab layout is shared with the BB7200 and BB22200 series and has a great deal in common with cabs of other SNCF locomotives of the 1960s. This class was also the first to introduce the VI ("Vitesse Imposée") cruise control system which is now standard on all SNCF locomotives delivered after 1971.

The electrical equipment consists of a single pantograph (type AM18U) which collects 25 kV from the catenary. Power is passed through a transformer which lowers the voltage to about 1500 V AC and a bridge rectifier controlled by thyristors rectify it into DC, which is then fed into the traction motors.

Brake equipment consists of pneumatic, electro-pneumatic, regenerative and dynamic brakes. The monomotor bogies were derived from the Y217 bogies of BB67400 locomotives and have primary (coil springs) and secondary ("sandwich" blocs) suspension.

The reliability of the locomotives is outstanding, as some locomotives have already passed the 10,000,000 km mark and have less than 2 defects per million kilometres, a number unrivaled by other similar European locomotives.

Liveries

BB15000 locomotives have carried at least six different liveries:

 The green "Maurienne" livery (so called because CC6500 locomotives also wore this livery and operated in the French Maurienne region) was worn by locomotives BB15001 - BB15005 between their delivery and 1982, when they were repainted into the TEE-Arzens livery.

 The TEE-Arzens livery was worn by locomotives from number BB15006 onwards by delivery; the first five green locomotives were also repainted in this livery in 1982. There were two variants of this livery: the original livery which consisted of silver, red and orange, and the modified one where the silver was replaced with opaque gray. Nowadays a number of locomotives still wear the original livery, the others having another one listed below.
 The "béton" (lit. concrete) livery, which was the standard livery of BB7200 and BB22200 locomotives, was tested on locomotives BB15034 and BB15040 in 1986-87 but was considered a failure as the locomotives got dirty too fast.
 The "Multiservices" livery (former known as Corail+, as on the coaches) was introduced in 1995 on BB15016 and consisted of two shades of gray, silver and red. Nearly half of the class was painted in this livery by 2002, when the new "en voyage..." livery was introduced on the series.
 The "en voyage..." livery was the latest livery of the class. Introduced on BB15063 in 2002. It consists of silver, purple on cab side 1 and cyan on cab side 2, and the "en voyage..." sticker with stylish motifs. The rights to use this design have expired and all locos still wearing it will be repainted in something else upon their next overhaul.
 A number of BB 15000 locos have been repainted in TER liveries of the regions where they run.

The experimental nature of the class

BB15000 locomotives were popular locomotives for conducting various experiments. A small overview:
While the locomotive had no technical difficulties at those speeds, the project was not continued due to the enormous cost of the infrastructure works which had to be undertaken.
 In 1973, BB15008 was used to test communication interferences on the now defunct Überherrn-Wadgassen line in Germany, exceptionally fed with 25 kV at that time.
 In 1974, BB15007 was taken out of service and transformed into BB7003, the prototype for the BB7200 locomotives. See SNCF Class BB 7003.
 In 1976, BB15015 was tested on the Marseille-Nice main line in order to prepare the line for the arrival of the similar, but bicurrent BB22200 locomotives.
Eventually six-axle locomotive CC21003 was rebuilt to US standards and sent to the United States instead.
 In 1979, BB15063 was equipped with the bogies of BB7248 which had a modified secondary suspension for operating in the Middle East. The Iranian Railways were interested in purchasing a locomotive class based on the BB15000 design. BB15063 retains these special bogies even today.
 In 1980, a BB15000 locomotive pulled middle cars of a TGV Sud-Est train set at high speeds in preparation of their services on the LGV Sud-Est.
 In 1981, locomotives BB15049 and BB15059 were used for testing the behaviour of the AM18U pantographs at high speeds in tunnels, related to use in the then not yet built Channel Tunnel.
 In 1982, BB15055 received synchronous motors. Later that year it was renumbered BB10004. See SNCF Class BB 10004.
 Also in 1982, BB15056 received a bimotor bogie with motors similar to the ones used in TGV Sud-Est sets.
 In 1983, BB7003 (original BB15007) was transformed into BB10003, a test-bed locomotive for asynchronous motors. See SNCF Class BB 10003.
 In 1989, BB10004 was restored to its original configuration and taken back into service with its original number, BB15055.
 In 1997, BB10003 was restored to its original configuration and taken back into service with its original number, BB15007.

Fleet list
Many of the class were named after French communes, towns and cities.

Models 
 This locomotive was reproduced in H0 scale by Jouef, Lima, LS Models, Märklin and Roco.
 This locomotive was reproduced in N scale by Fleischmann and Minitrix.

See also
 CP Class 2600 - similar locomotives built for the Portuguese Railways in 1974, with a  track gauge
 Korail Class 8000 - similar locomotives for Korail
 SŽ series 363 - similar locomotives for Slovenske Železnice
 NS Class 1600 - similar locomotives for Nederlandse Spoorwegen
 FEPASA Class 2200 - similar locomotives for  Ferrovia Paulista S/A https://pt.wikipedia.org/wiki/Ferrovia Paulista S/A

References

 Les BB 15000, 35 ans de services intensifs de l'Alsace aux Flandres. In: Rail Passion Hors-Serie: "Génération 4400 kW". July 2006. Éditions La Vie Du Rail, p. 6-29.

External links 

 Portrait of the BB15000 locomotives on Ferrovia (French)
 SNCF BB 15000 profile on Trainspo
 European Railway Picture Gallery
 Spec Sheet; French

Alstom locomotives
Standard gauge electric locomotives of France
15000
B-B locomotives
25 kV AC locomotives
Railway locomotives introduced in 1971
Passenger locomotives